The Alf Garnett Saga is a 1972 British comedy film directed by Bob Kellett and starring Warren Mitchell, Dandy Nichols, Paul Angelis and Adrienne Posta. The film was the second spin-off from the BBC TV series Till Death Us Do Part. It starts where the first film finished, but with Angelis and Posta now playing Mike and Rita, the roles previously played by Anthony Booth and Una Stubbs. Unlike the first movie, it has never been released on DVD.

Premise
With the Garnetts' Wapping home demolished, Alf and his family are installed in a high-rise council flat. Alf struggles with "living in the sky", using lifts (which frequently break down due to power cuts "caused by the striking miners") and walking long distances to the local pub. Alf also swallows LSD thinking it's a sugar cube and walks across his neighbours balcony handrail

Cast
 Warren Mitchell ...  Alf Garnett
 Dandy Nichols ...  Else Garnett
 Paul Angelis ...  Mike Rawlins
 Adrienne Posta ...  Rita Rawlins
 John Le Mesurier ...  Mr Frewin
 John Bird ...  Willis
 Roy Hudd ...  Milkman
 Roy Kinnear ...  Wally
 Joan Sims ...  Gran
 Arthur Askey ...  Himself
 George Best ...  Himself
 Max Bygraves ...  Himself
 Julie Ege ...  Herself
 Bobby Moore ...  Himself
 Eric Sykes ...  Himself
 Kenny Lynch ...  Himself
 Patsy Byrne ...  Mrs Frewin
 Ellis Dale ...  Clerk
 Derek Griffiths ...  Rex
 Cleo Sylvestre ...  Conductress
 Tom Chadbon ...  Jim
 Margaret Heald ...1st bird
 Patricia Quinn ...  2nd bird
 Ken Wynne ...  Non-smoker
 Ahmed Khalil ... Pakistani
 Mary Pratt ... Receptionist
 Will Stampe ... Publican
 Jumoke Debayo ... Coloured mother
 Elroy Josephs ... Coloured father
 Arnold Diamond ... Policeman
 Maurice Bush ... Docker
 Jackie Donachie ... Girl
 Richard Speight ... Boy
 Johnny Speight ... Barmy Harry

References

External links

1972 films
1972 comedy films
British comedy films
Films shot at EMI-Elstree Studios
1970s English-language films
Films based on television series
Till Death Us Do Part
Films directed by Bob Kellett
Columbia Pictures films
Warner Bros. films
1970s British films